Giacomo is an Italian name. It is the Italian version of the Hebrew name Jacob.

People
 Giacomo (name), including a list of people with the name

Other uses
 Giacomo (horse), a race horse, winner of the 2005 Kentucky Derby
 Giácomo (film), a 1939 Argentine film written by Armando Discépolo
 United Office Building, also known as Giacomo, a skyscraper in Niagara Falls, New York